Jodi Vaughan (born 25 April 1950) is an Australian-born country singer, songwriter, musician, television performer, and actor from Hamilton, New Zealand.

Television roles
 Regular appearances on That's Country in the 1980s
 Sir Howard Morrison: Time of My Life (1995) (TV)

Awards
 1982 Most Promising Female Vocalist
 2004 Scroll of Honour from the Variety Artists Club of New Zealand

Played with
 Eddie Low ( featured in Te Papa first on-line exhibition)
 The Musicians at Large (backed many tours)
 Sound Engineer
 First appearance at Tamworth Country Music Festival in 2020

Discography
 Fairweather Friends with Brendan Dugan (1982)
 No Fool Like an Old Fool with Brendan Dugan (1982)
 Rodeo Eyes (1984)
 Touch Your Heart (1985) EMI (featuring Ross Burge and Martin Winch)
 Straight From the Heart (1986)
 Together Again with Gray Bartlett & Brendan Dugan (1990)
 Christmas in New Zealand (1990)
 Together Again: The Reunion with Brendan Dugan & Gray Bartlett (1995)
 All the Best (Their Greatest Hits) with Brendan Dugan & Gray Bartlett (2014)
 That's Country TV Show DVD: Suzanne Prentice, Patsy Riggir, Jade Hurley, Eddie Low, Tony Williams, John Grenell, Jeff Rea, Peter Posa, Ritchie Pickett, Jodi Vaughan and more...
 Kiwi Country – From Auckland, New Zealand To Texas – US release
 You Look Silly Cryin''' (single, 2020)
 For the love of country'' (2022), her 10th album, almost entirely self-penned

See also
 Country music

References

External links
 cmstation
https://www.audioculture.co.nz/people/jodi-vaughan

1950 births
Living people
20th-century New Zealand women singers
New Zealand people of Australian descent
People from Hamilton, New Zealand
Place of birth missing (living people)